Esther Jummai Bali (born 1947) is a Nigerian writer of folktale stories.

Works 
 It's Story Time (1987)
 Taroh Folktales (1990) which was adapted into a short 55 minute movie 
 More Tales from Tarokland (1991)
 Plays from Tarok Folktales (1994)
 Tarok Folktales (1994)
 Learn, Join, and Colour (2000)
 Esther Bali: A Portrait of an Educationist (2000)

References

Living people
Nigerian writers
1947 births